A dakhma, also known as a Tower of Silence, is a circular, raised structure built by Zoroastrians for excarnation (that is, the exposure of human corpses to the elements for decomposition), in order to avert contamination of the soil and other natural elements by the dead bodies. Carrion birds, usually vultures and other scavengers, consume the flesh. Skeletal remains are gathered into a central pit where further weathering and continued breakdown occurs.

History

	
Zoroastrian ritual exposure of the dead is first known of from the writings of the Ancient Greek historian Herodotus (mid-5th century BCE), who observed the custom amongst Iranian expatriates in Asia Minor. In Herodotus' account (Histories i.140), the Zoroastrian funerary rites are said to have been "secret", but were first performed after the body had been dragged around by a bird or dog. The corpse was then embalmed with wax and laid in a trench.
	
The discovery of ossuaries in both Eastern and Western Iran dating to the 5th and 4th centuries BCE indicate that bones were sometimes isolated, but separation occurring through ritual exposure cannot be assumed: burial mounds, where the bodies were wrapped in wax, have also been discovered. The tombs of the Achaemenid emperors at Naqsh-e Rustam and Pasargadae likewise suggest non-exposure, at least until the bones could be collected. According to legend (incorporated by Ferdowsi into his), Zoroaster himself is interred in a tomb at Balkh (in present-day Afghanistan).

Zoroastrian exposure of the dead is first attested in the mid-5th century BCE Histories of Herodotus, but the use of towers is first documented in the early 9th century CE. The doctrinal rationale for exposure is to avoid contact with earth, water, or fire, all three of which are considered sacred in the Zoroastrian religion.

Writing on the culture of the Persians, Herodotus reports on the Persian burial customs performed by the magi, which are kept secret. However, he writes that he knows they expose the body of male dead to dogs and birds of prey, then they cover the corpse in wax, and then it is buried. The Achaemenid custom is recorded for the dead in the regions of Bactria, Sogdia, and Hyrcania, but not in Western Iran.
	
The Byzantine historian Agathias has described the Zoroastrian burial of the Sasanian general Mihr-Mihroe: "the attendants of Mermeroes took up his body and removed it to a place outside the city and laid it there as it was, alone and uncovered according to their traditional custom, as refuse for dogs and horrible carrion".
	
Towers are a much later invention and are first documented in the early 9th century CE. The funerary ritual customs surrounding that practice appear to date to the Sassanid ra (3rd–7th CE). They are known in detail from the supplement to the Shayest ne Shayest, the two Rivayat collections, and the two Saddars.

Rationale
Zoroastrian tradition considers human cadavers and animal corpses (in addition to cut hair and nail parings) to be nasu, i.e. unclean, polluting. Specifically,  the corpse demon, is believed to rush into the body and contaminate everything it comes into contact with. Moreover, the  requires that graves, and raised tombs as well, must be destroyed.

To preclude the pollution of the sacred elements: earth, water, and fire, the bodies of the dead are placed at the top of towers and there exposed to the sun and to scavenging birds and necrophagous animals such as wild dogs. Thus, as an early-20th-century Secretary of the Bombay Parsi community explained: "putrefaction with all its concomitant evils... is most effectually prevented."

In current times

Structure and process
Modern-day towers, which are fairly uniform in their construction, have an almost flat roof, with the perimeter being slightly higher than the centre. The roof is divided into three concentric rings: the bodies of men are arranged around the outer ring, women in the second ring, and children in the innermost ring.

Once the bones have been bleached by the sun and wind, which can take as long as a year, they are collected in an ossuary pit at the centre of the tower, where—assisted by lime—they gradually disintegrate, and the remaining material, along with rainwater run-off, seeps through multiple coal and sand filters before being eventually washed out to sea.

Iran

In the Iranian Zoroastrian tradition, the towers were built atop hills or low mountains in locations distant from population centres. In the early 20th century, Iranian Zoroastrians gradually discontinued their use and began to favour burial or cremation.

The decision to change the system was accelerated by three considerations: the first problem arose with the establishment of the Dar ul-Funun medical school. Since Islam considers unnecessary dissection of corpses as a form of mutilation, thus forbidding it, there were no corpses for study available through official channels. The towers were repeatedly broken into, much to the dismay of the Zoroastrian community. Secondly, while the towers had been built away from population centres, the growth of the towns led to the towers now being within city limits. Finally, many of the Zoroastrians found the system outdated. Following long negotiations between the anjuman societies of Yazd, Kerman, and Tehran, the latter gained a majority and established a cemetery some 10 km from Tehran at Ghassr-e Firouzeh (Firouzeh's Palace). The graves were lined with rocks and plastered with cement to prevent direct contact with the earth. In Yazd and Kerman, in addition to cemeteries, orthodox Zoroastrians continued to maintain a tower until the  Iranian revolution of 1979 when ritual exposure was prohibited by law.

India

Following the rapid expansion of the Indian cities, the squat buildings are today in or near population centres, but separated from the metropolitan bustle by gardens or forests. In Parsi Zoroastrian tradition, exposure of the dead is also considered to be an individual's final act of charity, providing the birds with what would otherwise be destroyed.

In the late 20th century and early 21st century the vulture population on the Indian subcontinent declined (see Indian vulture crisis) by over 97% as of 2008, primarily due to diclofenac poisoning of the birds following the introduction of that drug for livestock in the 1990s, until banned for cattle by the Government of India in 2006. The few surviving birds are often unable to fully consume the bodies. In 2001, Parsi communities in India were evaluating captive breeding of vultures and the use of "solar concentrators" (which are essentially large mirrors) to accelerate decomposition. Some have been forced to resort to burial, as the solar collectors work only in clear weather. Vultures used to dispose of a body in minutes, and no other method has proved fully effective.

The right to use the Towers of Silence is a much-debated issue among the Parsi community. These usually having five priests on a nine-member board. In accordance with Indian statutes, these associations have domestic authority over trust properties and have the right to grant or restrict entry and use, with the result that the associations frequently prohibit the use by the offspring of a "mixed marriage", that is, where one parent is a Parsi and the other is not.

The towers remain in use as sacred locations for the Parsi community, though non-members may not enter them.  In Mumbai visitors are shown a model of a tower. Organized tours can be taken to the site.

Architectural and functional features
 The towers are uniform in their construction.
 The roof of the tower is lower in the middle than the outer and is divided into three concentric circles.
 The dead bodies are placed on stone beds on the roof of the tower and there is a central ossuary pit, into which the bodies fall after eaten by vultures.
 The bodies disintegrate naturally assisted with lime and the remaining is washed off by rainwater into multiple filters of coal and sand, finally reaching the sea.

See also 
 Fire temple, Zoroastrian place of worship
 Seth Modi Hirji Vachha, builder of the first Bombay (Mumbai)  (1672) 
 Sky burial
 , air as a sacred element; the Zoroastrian divinity of wind

References

Further reading

Vendidad Fargard 5, Purity Laws, as translated by James Darmesteter

Excerpted in 

Lucarelli, Fosco "Towers of Silence: Zoroastrian Architectures for the Ritual of Death", "Socks-Studio", Feb 9, 2012

Harris, Gardiner "Giving New Life to Vultures to Restore a Human Ritual of Death", "The New York Times", Nov 29, 2012

Architecture in Iran
Death customs
Persian words and phrases
Religion and death
Towers in India
Towers in Iran
Zoroastrianism